Karen Elizabeth Schreier (born July 29, 1956) is a United States district judge of the United States District Court for the District of South Dakota and was the 36th United States Attorney for the District of South Dakota.

Early life and education 

Born in Sioux Falls, South Dakota, Schreier earned an Artium Baccalaureus degree from Saint Louis University in 1978 and a Juris Doctor from the Saint Louis University School of Law in 1981.

Career 
Schreier worked as a judicial law clerk for South Dakota Supreme Court Justice Francis G. Dunn from 1981 until 1982. Schreier worked in private law practice in Sioux Falls from 1982 until 1993. She then became the United States Attorney for the District of South Dakota in 1993. She became the first woman to serve as U.S. Attorney in South Dakota and served in that capacity until her appointment to the federal bench in 1999.

Federal judicial service 

On March 8, 1999, President Bill Clinton nominated Schreier to be a United States District Judge of the United States District Court for the District of South Dakota to replace Richard Battey, who had taken senior status on January 1, 1999. The United States Senate confirmed Schreier on June 30, 1999, as part of a package of nominees it approved in a 94–4 vote. Schreier served as Chief Judge from 2006 until 2013.

See also 
 List of first women lawyers and judges in South Dakota

References

Sources

1956 births
Living people
People from Sioux Falls, South Dakota
Judges of the United States District Court for the District of South Dakota
United States district court judges appointed by Bill Clinton
Saint Louis University alumni
Saint Louis University School of Law alumni
United States Attorneys for the District of South Dakota
20th-century American judges
21st-century American judges
20th-century American women judges
21st-century American women judges